The Three Rats (Spanish:Las Tres Ratas) is a 1946 Argentine drama film directed by Carlos Schlieper and starring Mecha Ortiz, Amelia Bence and María Duval. It is an adaptation of Alfredo Pareja Diezcanseco's 1944 novel of the same title.

Cast
 Mecha Ortiz as Mercedes de la Fuente  
 Amelia Bence as Eugenia de la Fuente  
 María Duval as Ana Luisa de la Fuente  
 Miguel Faust Rocha as Alfredo Millán  
 Santiago Gómez Cou as Ernesto Carbó  
 Ricardo Passano as Oscar Aranda  
 Felisa Mary as Aurora de la Fuente  
 Floren Delbene as Carlos 
 Amalia Sánchez Ariño as Consuelo  
 Juan José Piñeyro as Zabala  
 Lalo Bouhier as Inspector de policía  
 Aurelia Ferrer as Bernarda  
 Cirilo Etulain as Horacio Saldaña  
 Gonzalo Palomero as Capataz  
 Jorge Villoldo as Mozo  
 Jorge Eamboez as Amigo  
 Nélida Romero as Modista 1  
 Soledad Marcó as Modista 2  
 Marcelo Lavalle as Muchacho  
 Estela Vidal as Mucama  
 Francisco Audenino

References

Bibliography 
 Plazaola, Luis Trelles. South American Cinema. La Editorial, UPR, 1989.

External links 
 

1946 films
1946 drama films
Argentine drama films
1940s Spanish-language films
Films directed by Carlos Schlieper
Films scored by Alejandro Gutiérrez del Barrio
Argentine black-and-white films
1940s Argentine films